The Compulsory Education Act or Oregon School Law was a 1922 law in the U.S. state of Oregon that required school age children to attend only public schools. The United States Supreme Court later struck down the law as unconstitutional.

Background

In the late 19th and early 20th centuries, millions of immigrants from Southern and Eastern Europe poured into the United States for economic and social opportunities, many of whom were poor peasants of Catholic and Jewish faith. Since the U.S. was predominantly a Protestant society at the time, many saw these new immigrants as a threat, seeing them as criminals, competitors for jobs and housing, and their faith being supposedly incompatible with American values.  The Oregon State Immigration Commission stated its preferences even more clearly in its 1912 annual report:

In 1920, 13% of the population in Oregon were immigrants, 8% were Catholic, and less than 0.4% were black (caused by Oregon black exclusion laws). Racial and religious prejudices were hard to break, however. A scant percent of Oregon’s students attended private school as well, about 7%, but more than three quarters of those private schools were run by the Catholic Church. In 1920, sociologist John Daniels said, “[Children] go into the kindergarten as little Poles or Italians or Finns, babbling in the tongues of their parents, and at the end of half a dozen years or more… [They] emerge, looking, talking, thinking, and behaving generally like full-fledged Americans.” For Protestants, public schools seemed like they could be used as the great American melting pot, to teach “Pure Americanism” to the new immigrants and assimilate them into Protestant culture.

Enacting the Oregon Compulsory Education Act

In 1922, the Masonic Grand Lodge of Oregon sponsored an initiative to require all school-age children to attend public schools. With support also of the state Ku Klux Klan and 1922 Democratic gubernatorial candidate Walter M. Pierce, the Compulsory Education Law was passed by a vote of 115,506 to 103,685.  Its primary purpose was to shut down Catholic schools in Oregon, but it also affected other private and military schools. It was challenged in court and struck down by the United States Supreme Court Pierce v. Society of Sisters (1925) before it went into effect. The law, which was officially called the Compulsory Education Act and unofficially became known as the Oregon School Law, did not just require that children between the ages of eight and sixteen had to attend school; it required that they attend only public schools.  By prohibiting children from attending private or parochial schools, the state thus forced such schools to close.

Outraged Catholics organized locally and nationally for the right to send their children to Catholic schools. In a 1925 decision, the United States Supreme Court declared the Oregon School Law unconstitutional in a ruling that has been called "the Magna Carta of the parochial school system."  In the ruling, the Court asserted that "the child is not the mere creature of the state" and settled the question of whether or not private schools had a right to exist in The United States.

In 1929, Pope Pius XI explicitly referenced this Supreme Court case in his encyclical Divini illius magistri on Catholic education. He quoted this part of the case, which says:The fundamental theory of liberty upon which all governments in this Union repose excludes any general power of the State to standardize its children by forcing them to accept instruction from public teachers only. The child is not the mere creature of the State; those who nurture him and direct his destiny have the right coupled with the high duty, to recognize, and prepare him for additional duties.

See also
 Bennett Law
Meyer v. Nebraska
 Pierce v. Society of Sisters

Further reading
 Lloyd P. Jorgenson. "The Oregon School Law of 1922: Passage and Sequel," The Catholic Historical Review, Vol. 54, No. 3 (Oct., 1968), pp. 455–466  in JSTOR
 David B. Tyack. "The Perils of Pluralism: The Background of the Pierce Case,"American Historical Review, Vol. 74, No. 1 (Oct., 1968), pp. 74–98  in JSTOR

References

Oregon law
1922 in law
Anti-Catholicism in the United States
Ku Klux Klan in Oregon
1922 in Oregon
United States education law
Public education in Oregon